The 2020 European Women's Handball Championship was held from 3 to 20 December 2020. The games were played in Herning and Kolding, Denmark.

Originally, this tournament would be held with 2 host countries: Norway and Denmark. However, lacking some time for the beginning, Norway renounced the right to seat, respecting the local legislation about the COVID-19 pandemic.

The tournament was also be one of the qualification events for the 2021 World Women's Handball Championship. It was also be played behind closed doors due to the pandemic.

Norway won the tournament for the eighth time after defeating France in the final. Croatia won the third place game to capture their first ever medal.

Venues 
On 9 September 2020, the Norwegian Handball Federation announced, that all games scheduled to take place in Norway, would be played in Trondheim, while on 6 November, the Danish Handball Federation announced, that all games scheduled to take place in Denmark, would be played in Jyske Bank Boxen, Herning. On 16 November, Norway withdrew altogether for health reasons. Danish Sydbank Arena then announced a wish to co-host the tournament together with Herning and this was approved of by the Danish government on 23 November 2020.

Qualification 

Due to the COVID-19 pandemic, the qualification was cancelled and the 2018 final ranking decided the participants.

Qualified teams

Draw 
The draw was held on 18 June 2020 in Vienna, Austria.

Seedings 
The pots were announced on 7 May 2020.

Squads 

Each squad consisted of 16 players, with a maximum of six players who could be replaced during the tournament. However, in regard to the COVID-19 pandemic and the potential risk of several players from the same team testing positive, there was no limit to the number of replacements for players testing positive.

Referees 
10 referee pairs were selected on 9 October 2020. Two new pairs were added ahead of the main round.

Preliminary round 
All times are local (UTC+1).

Group A

Group B

Group C

Group D

Main round 
Points gained in the preliminary round against team that also advanced, were carried over.

Group I

Group II

Knockout stage

Bracket

Fifth place game

Semifinals

Third place game

Final

Final ranking and awards

Final ranking

All Star Team 
The All Star Team and awards were announced on 20 December 2020.

Statistics

Top goalscorers

Top goalkeepers

Notes

References

External links 

 
2020
European Championship, Women, 2020
European Handball Championship
2020 in Danish sport
December 2020 sports events in Europe
Sport in Herning